The 2000 LNBP was the 1st season of the Liga Nacional de Baloncesto Profesional, one of the professional basketball leagues of Mexico. It started on August 7, 2000 and ended in December 2000. The league title was won by Correcaminos UAT Tampico, which defeated Correcaminos UAT Victoria in the championship series.

Format 
11 teams take part in the season. Since the number of teams is odd, one team rests each week. The teams are divided in two groups (A and B), and their ranking among these groups depends on their position in the regular season standings. The first 4 teams of each group qualify for the postseason.

Teams

Regular season

Standings

Groups

Group A

Group B

Playoffs 
Note: for reasons not specified on the LNBP website, La Ola Roja del Distrito Federal was the fourth team qualified from the Group B, despite being ranked 5th. The team playing the first game at home is listed first.

 Quarterfinals (best-of-5, played November 14 – November 20):
 Osos de Saltillo (A1) vs. La Ola Roja del Distrito Federal (B4)
 Indios de la UACJ (A2) vs. Vaqueros de Agua Prieta (B3)
 Correcaminos UAT Matamoros (A3) vs. Correcaminos UAT Victoria (B2)
 Correcaminos Tampico (B1) vs. Algodoneros de la Comarca (B4)

 Semifinals (best-of-7, played November 22 – November 30):
 Correcaminos UAT Victoria vs. unknown
 Correcaminos UAT Tampico vs. unknown

 Finals (best-of-7, played December 2 – December 10):
 Correcaminos UAT Tampico vs. Correcaminos UAT Victoria

All-Star Game 
The first LNBP All-Star Game was played in Ciudad Victoria at the Gimnasio Multidisciplinario de la Universidad Autónoma de Tamaulipas de Ciudad Victoria on October 19, 2000 at 20:30, and was broadcast by ESPN2. The game was played between a team of Mexican players (Mexicanos) and a team of foreign players (Extranjeros). The Mexican won, 104–98. The game MVP was Mexican José Escobedo.

Teams 

Mexicanos
 David Amaya (Correcaminos UAT Matamoros)
 Rafael Bellamy (Garzas de Plata de la UAEH)
 Florentino Chávez (Correcaminos UAT Tampico)
 José Escobedo (Indios de la UACJ)
 Erick Langford (Correcaminos UAT Matamoros)
 Eduardo Liñan (Vaqueros de Agua Prieta)
 Víctor Mariscal (Osos de Saltillo)
 Arturo Montes (Dorados de Chihuahua)
 Omar Quintero (Correcaminos UAT Victoria)
 Antonio Reyes (Correcaminos UAT Reynosa)
 Rafael Sandoval (La Ola Roja del Distrito Federal)
 Francisco Siller (Osos de Saltillo)
 Rafael Solís (Correcaminos UAT Victoria)
 Coaches: Lewis Lasalle Taylor (Dorados de Chihuahua) and Luis Manuel López (Correcaminos UAT Tampico)

Extranjeros
  Richard Cannon (La Ola Roja del Distrito Federal)
  James Carter (Correcaminos UAT Tampico)
  Chris Doyal (Osos de Saltillo)
  Alex Falcón (Algodoneros de la Comarca)
  Bobby Joe Hatton (Correcaminos UAT Victoria)
  Keenan Jourdon (Vaqueros de Agua Prieta)
  Guillermo Myers (Correcaminos UAT Tampico)
  Berry Randle (Correcaminos UAT Reynosa)
  DeRon Rutledge (Dorados de Chihuahua)
  Dwight Stewart (Correcaminos UAT Victoria)
  Larry Washington (Garzas de Plata de la UAEH)
  Matt Watts (Algodoneros de la Comarca)
  Steve Wise (Indios de la UACJ)
 Coaches:  José Claros (Correcaminos UAT Victoria) and  Antonio Forteza (Osos de Saltillo)

References

External links 
 2000 LNBP season on Latinbasket.com

LNBP seasons
2000 in Mexican sports
2000–01 in North American basketball